Lucía Rodríguez may refer to:
 Lucía Rodríguez (athlete)
 Lucía Rodríguez (footballer)